Langpoklakpam Jayantakumar Singh (Meitei pronunciation: /lāng-pōk-lāk-pam ja-yant-kū-mār sīng/) is an Indian politician. He was elected to the Manipur Legislative Assembly from Keishamthong in the 2017 Manipur Legislative Assembly election as a member of the National People's Party. He was Minister of Health, Family Welfare, Law and Legislative, Art and Culture in N. Biren Singh cabinet. He was the chairman of the Lainingthou Sanamahi Temple Board, the temple development board of Lainingthou Sanamahi of the Sanamahi religion.

References

1966 births
Living people
People from Imphal
Manipur MLAs 2017–2022
National People's Party (India) politicians
Indian National Congress politicians